Muni is a 2007 Indian  comedy horror film written and directed by Raghava Lawrence, who also plays the lead role. The film also features Vedhika, Rajkiran and Rahul Dev among others play supporting roles, while the film's score is composed by S. P. Venkatesh the songs were composed by Bharadwaj. The film released on 9 March 2007 along with a Telugu dubbed version of same name and gained positive reviews and huge box office collections. Later, it was dubbed into Hindi as Pratisodh: Ek Real Revenge in 2011. And In Bhojpuri as Kab Hokhi Mukthi Hamar. In 2011, a sequel titled Muni 2: Kanchana was released directed by Raghava Lawrence. It is the first installment in the Muni (film series).

Plot
Ganesh, a young man with a deep fear of ghosts who refuses go out after 6PM, moves into a new house with his mother, father, and wife Priya. All of a sudden, Ganesh is possessed by a ghost and starts behaving in a rude manner; his family cannot understand his behaviour, so they seek the help of a priest named Andaiyar. Andaiyar asks the ghost about his past. The ghost says that he is Muniyaandi and starts revealing his flashback.

Muni was a kindhearted but poor man living in the slums with his daughter. His friend is MLA Marakka Dhandapani, who uses Muni to win local elections and promises that he would give lands to the poor villagers. Dhandapani wins the election but cheats Muni. Muni fights with Dhandapani, who kills Muni and his daughter. Dhandapani lies to the poor people by saying that Muni and his daughter fled with the money that he had given Muni for the welfare of the villagers.

Ganesh enters Dhandapani's household and terrorizes him and his assistants. Dhandapani learns that Muni's spirit is in Ganesh's body, so he gets a shaman named Mastan Bhai to save his life. Bhai bargains with Muni, who agrees to let Dhandapani go if he repents and helps the poor villagers. In the climax, at Ayyanaar temple, Dhandapani confesses to the people that he killed Muni and his daughter. He then leaves money with the villagers. Muni talks with the people and eats the feast prepared by them. Bhai tells Muni to leave Ganesh's body, and he does. However, Dhandapani lied and was planning to get back all his money from the villagers. Ganesh, upon hearing this, kills Dhandapani. Bhai sees this act but does nothing, as he finally sees the injustice done by Dhandapani.

Cast

 Raghava Lawrence as Ganesh, a timid man who is scared of ghosts and he always comes home at 6:00pm. He is possessed by ghosts.
 Rajkiran as Muniyandi/Muni, a human turned ghost who was killed by a MLA Dhandapani and his gangs by burning him alive and he always possessed Ganesh's body who was come for revenge.
 Vedhika as Priya Ganesh (Ganesh's wife)
 Vinu Chakravarthy as Kandasaamy, Ganesh's father 
 Kovai Sarala as Kannamma, Ganesh's mother
 Dhandapani as MLA Dhandapani, an antagonist
 Rahul Dev as Mastan Bhai, the shaman , contract killer and a Muslim exorcist 
 Nassar as Andaiyar, a Hindu priest
 Delhi Ganesh as Ganesh, Priya's father
 Meera Krishnan as Priya's mother
 Scissor Manohar as House Broker
 Neelima Naidu as Chandramukhi
 Bianca Desai
 Bala Singh
 Vadivelu David as Murugesan
 Kallukkul Eeram Ramanathan
 Pudhupettai Suresh
 Citizen Mani
 Asha
 Kavya
 Rangammal
 Kavithan Rajamohan

Music
The film's original soundtrack has been composed by Bharadwaj. Lyrics written by Pa. Vijay and Raghava Lawrence.

Reception

Box office

Critical response
Muni received generally positive reviews from critics. IndiaGlitz.com called the movie a visual treat from Lawrence.

Release

Theatrical
It was released in also theatre's and it gives huge response from this film.

Home media
Satellite rights went to Kalaignar TV. The satellite rights to the Telugu dubbed version went to Gemini TV. The satellite rights to the Hindi dubbed version were given to Colors Cineplex. The satellite rights to the Bhojpuri dubbed version were given to Abzy Dhakad.

Sequels

The success of the film spawned four sequels.

References

External links
 

2007 films
Indian comedy horror films
2007 comedy horror films
Indian films about revenge
2000s Tamil-language films
Films scored by Bharadwaj (composer)
2007 comedy films
Films directed by Raghava Lawrence